Michael Christopher Crudale (born January 3, 1977) is a former professional baseball pitcher who played two seasons at the major league level with the St. Louis Cardinals and Milwaukee Brewers in 2002–03.

MLB career
Selected by the Cardinals in the 24th round of the 1999 amateur entry draft, Crudale played his first professional season with their Rookie League team, the Johnson City Cardinals in 1999. After moving up the Cardinals chain, Crudale made the big club out of spring training in 2002 and pitched well, with a 3–0 mark and a 1.88 ERA out of the bullpen (plus one start). Crudale spent most of the 2003 season at AAA Memphis, however, and was dealt in August to Milwaukee, who released him in spring training in 2004. Dogged by injuries, he pitched poorly for minor-league teams in the Pittsburgh Pirates and San Francisco Giants minor league systems later that season, ending his affiliated baseball career. (Ironically, his major league ERA was an excellent 2.09, less than half of his minor-league mark of 4.38.)

Later career
After leaving Organized Baseball, Crudale pitched three seasons for the independent Long Island Ducks of the Atlantic League from 2005 to 2007. Continuing his baseball career abroad, he played in Italy (De Angelis Godo Baseball) in 2007, then moved on to Taiwan with the CPBL's dmedia T-REX in 2008. He returned to Europe for his final season as a player with the Sanmarinese-Italian team T & A San Marino in 2009.

In 2008, Mike briefly worked as an instructor at Turn 2 sports training facility in Collinsville, Illinois; he now coaches the DBA Crushers (12-and-under) squad in Danville, California.

In popular culture
The phrase "And Mike Crudale" has become something of an internet meme, starting as a running gag on the Baseball Think Factory website, often used to terminate a lengthy paragraph or mind-numbing list of trivia.

References
"Turn 2 Instructors". Turn 2 Instructors Page 21 March 2008.
"Mike Crudale's transfer to San Marino". Baseball.it 2 February 2009.

External links

1977 births
Living people
Altoona Curve players
Baseball players from San Diego
De Angelis Godo players
American expatriate baseball players in San Marino
Fresno Grizzlies players
Indianapolis Indians players
Johnson City Cardinals players
Long Island Ducks players
Major League Baseball pitchers
Memphis Redbirds players
Milwaukee Brewers players
Nashville Sounds players
New Haven Ravens players
Peoria Chiefs players
Potomac Cannons players
Santa Clara Broncos baseball players
Santa Clara University alumni
St. Louis Cardinals players
T & A San Marino players
American expatriate baseball players in Taiwan
Dmedia T-REX players